Theodore Gosewisch House, also known as Fuenfhausen Residence, is a historic home located near Lexington, Lafayette County, Missouri.  It was built about 1847, and is a two-story, central passage plan, Greek Revival style brick I-house. It has a two-story rear ell with open shed-roofed porch. The front facade features a one-story Victorian front porch installed in the early 1900s.

It was listed on the National Register of Historic Places in 1997.

References

Houses on the National Register of Historic Places in Missouri
Greek Revival houses in Missouri
Victorian architecture in Missouri
Houses completed in 1847
Houses in Lafayette County, Missouri
National Register of Historic Places in Lafayette County, Missouri